Nationalism and regionalism is present in the political spectrum of the Principality of Asturias, northern Spain. Asturian nationalist parties such as Partíu Asturianista had representation in the Asturian parliament and government, and others such as Andecha Astur had representation in some municipalities. However, nationalism is more of a social than a political movement.

History 
These movements are rooted in the stages of political sovereignty that Asturias experienced, beginning with the Kingdom of Asturias between the years 718 and 925, followed a millennium later with the declaration of sovereignty of The General Assembly of the Principality of Asturias of 1808, the Socialist Asturian Republic in 1934 and the Sovereign Council of Asturias and León of 1937 as highlights, although the two last are not nationalistic. 

In 1976 the first modern Asturian nationalist party, the Asturian Nationalist Council, was founded. Modern-day Asturian nationalism includes political parties and organizations from the left of the political spectrum, including socialist Andecha Astur/Darréu, Unidá and Bloque por Asturies in the left-wing, and the social-democrat Partíu Asturianista. Combined, they represent a minimal part of Asturian society.

Political parties and organizations 

 Andecha Astur, leftist nationalist political party (socialist).
 Bloque por Asturies, leftist nationalist political party. In coalition with Izquierda Unida in Asturias.
 Unidá Nacionalista Asturiana, leftist nationalist political party formed by Izquierda Asturiana and other organizations.
 Unión Asturianista, electoral coalition of the social democrat nationalist Partíu Asturianista and the centrist- autonomist Unión Renovadora Asturiana.
 Conceyu Abiertu
 Compromisu por Asturies
 Darréu: youth organization.
 Corriente Sindical d'Izquierda: union.

External links
Andecha Astur
Bloque por Asturies
Partíu Asturianista
Unidá Nacionalista Asturiana
Unión Asturianista
Asturian irredentism